"Getting Better" is a 1967 song recorded by the Beatles, written by John Lennon and Paul McCartney.

Getting Better may also refer to:

"Getting Better" (Shed Seven song), a single released in 1996
"Gettin' Better", a track from the album Mechanical Resonance by Tesla, 1986

See also
"It's Getting Better All the Time",  a single by American country music group Brooks & Dunn 
"Keeps Gettin' Better",  a single by American singer Christina Aguilera
Keeps Gettin' Better: A Decade of Hits, an album by American singer Christina Aguilera
"My Dreams Are Getting Better All the Time", a popular song published in 1945
"Every day, in every way, I'm getting better and better", the mantra of Émile Coué
"It's Getting Better", a 1969 hit single by Cass Elliot